Monoxia is a genus of skeletonizing leaf beetles in the family Chrysomelidae. There are about 18 described species in Monoxia. They are found in North America and the Neotropics.

Species
These 18 species belong to the genus Monoxia:

 Monoxia andrewsi Riley, 2020 
 Monoxia angularis (J. L. LeConte, 1859)
 Monoxia apicalis Blake, 1939
 Monoxia batisia Blatchley, 1917
 Monoxia beebei Blake
 Monoxia brisleyi Blake, 1939
 Monoxia consputa (J. L. LeConte, 1857)
 Monoxia debilis J. L. LeConte, 1865
 Monoxia elegans Blake, 1939
 Monoxia grisea Blake, 1939
 Monoxia guttulata (J. L. LeConte, 1865)
 Monoxia inornata Blake, 1939
 Monoxia minuta Blake, 1939
 Monoxia obesula Blake, 1939
 Monoxia pallida Blake, 1939
 Monoxia puberula Blake, 1939
 Monoxia schizonycha Blake, 1939
 Monoxia sordida (J. L. LeConte, 1858)

References

Further reading

 
 
 
 

Galerucinae
Chrysomelidae genera
Articles created by Qbugbot
Taxa named by John Lawrence LeConte